Neist Point is a viewpoint on the  most westerly point of Skye. Neist Point Lighthouse has been located there since 1909.

Geography
Neist Point is the most westerly point on the Duirinish peninsula on the Isle of Skye. It projects into The Minch and provides a walk and viewpoint.

Natural history
Basalt at Neist Point is very similar to that at the Giant's Causeway in Northern Ireland. A steep path leads down from the road. Whales, dolphins, porpoises and basking shark can be seen from the point. Common seabirds include gannets, black guillemots, razorbills and European shags. Several rare plants, including saxifrages are found on the point.

References

External links

Landforms of the Isle of Skye
Headlands of Scotland
Landforms of Highland (council area)